Ago di Sciora is a mountain in the Bregaglia Range of the Alps, located south of Vicosoprano in the canton of Graubünden. It forms a sharp needle in the middle of the Sciora group.

References

External links
 Ago di Sciora on Summitpost.org
 Ago di Sciora on Hikr

Mountains of Graubünden
Mountains of the Alps
Alpine three-thousanders
Mountains of Switzerland
Bregaglia